McGavock High School (commonly McGavock or Big Mac) is a public high school located in Nashville, Tennessee. The high school is a Model Academy School (affiliated with the National Career Academy Coalition).

In January 2014, President Barack Obama visited McGavock High School to discuss the success of the academy model.

History 

McGavock Comprehensive High School opened in 1971. It initially served students in grades ten through twelve who had previously attended Cameron, Donelson and Two Rivers high schools. McGavock added ninth grade in 1978.

McGavock is a part of the Metropolitan Nashville Public Schools system. It sits on a part of the McGavock plantation that was purchased by Metro Parks in 1968 for $68,000. The land is still the property of the park service. The school was named for the antebellum Two Rivers mansion built by David H. McGavock.

McGavock was the first truly comprehensive high school built in Nashville. Planning for the school took place during the administration of Superintendent Dr. John Harris. Dr. James Burns, the resident consultant for secondary development for Metro-Nashville Public Schools, developed a structure that would serve as a model for other comprehensive high schools.

McGavock was the first high school in Nashville that combined the academic program with extensive vocational training.

Facilities
McGavock is the largest high school in Tennessee, with a little under 500,000 sq. feet. McGavock has four softball fields, a baseball diamond, six tennis courts, a football stadium and a track. The 14-acre building houses 82 classrooms, 14 science labs, a credit union, a flight simulator, a bistro, nine Career and Technical shop/classroom areas (including a student-run courtroom and a health science lab) seven business education labs, two gymnasiums, two cafeterias, a 586 seat auditorium, and formerly a two-story library (currently a one story on the second floor) with fiction, audio-visuals, materials and equipment on one level, and non-fiction and computers on the other. It has a green room, a planetarium, a computer and technical education (CTE) lab equipped with 60 computers and a CTE presentation room equipped with state-of-the-art projection capabilities.

Marching band

The school has a strong band program, having won the state championship 25 times: 1972–1979, 1982, 1987–1991, 1993–1994, 1997–2000, 2002–2005, 2019.

Winner of internationally acclaimed John Philip Sousa Foundation Sudler Shield Award 1994
Bands of America Southeastern Regional Champions, Georgia Dome, Atlanta, Georgia 1995, 1996
Finalist band in Bands of America Grand National Championships in 1986, 1987, 1988, 1990

Southern Regional Grand Champions in Bands of America Southern Regional Championships - 1990.

Recognized by the National Band Association as one of the Ten Finest Bands in the United States.

Notable alumni

Chris Claybrooks, football player
Lorianne Crook, Co-host of Crook & Chase, Music City Tonight
 Dwayne Johnson ("The Rock"), actor and professional wrestler (Attended but did not graduate)
Nate Bargatze, comedian

References

External links
 

Public high schools in Tennessee
Schools in Nashville, Tennessee
Educational institutions established in 1971
1971 establishments in Tennessee